LGBT-related films released in the 1980s are listed in the following articles:
 List of LGBT-related films of 1980
 List of LGBT-related films of 1981
 List of LGBT-related films of 1982
 List of LGBT-related films of 1983
 List of LGBT-related films of 1984
 List of LGBT-related films of 1985
 List of LGBT-related films of 1986
 List of LGBT-related films of 1987
 List of LGBT-related films of 1988
 List of LGBT-related films of 1989

 
1980s